"Hey Jude" is a 1968 song by the Beatles.

Hey Jude may also refer to:
 Hey Jude (Beatles album), 1970
 Hey Jude (Wilson Pickett album), 1969
 Hey Jude (film), a 2018 Malayalam-language Indian film

See also 
 Hey Jude/Hey Bing!, an album by Bing Crosby